Dale Messer is a former professional American football player who played wide receiver for five seasons for the San Francisco 49ers.

References

1937 births
American football wide receivers
San Francisco 49ers players
Fresno State Bulldogs football players
Living people
People from Lemoore, California